

Medal winners in Lithuania men's national basketball team 
Full list of the 82 Lithuanian medal winners while playing in both Lithuania men's national basketball team and the Soviet Union national basketball team in Olympic Games, World Cups and EuroBaskets.

Note: updated to Eurobasket 2017

See also 
 Lithuania national basketball team
 Lithuanian Basketball Federation
 Basketball at the Summer Olympics
 FIBA Basketball World Cup
 FIBA EuroBasket

References

External links 

 FIBA Europe official website
 FIBA profile
 EuroBasket.com profile

Lithuania national basketball team
Basketball statistics